2009 Gamba Osaka season

Competitions

Player statistics

Other pages
 J. League official site

Gamba Osaka
Gamba Osaka seasons